Paulo Coelho de Souza (born 24 August 1947) is a Brazilian lyricist and novelist and a member of the Brazilian Academy of Letters since 2002. His novel The Alchemist became an international best-seller and he has published 28 more books since then.

Biography
Paulo Coelho was born in Rio de Janeiro, Brazil, and attended a Jesuit school. At 17, Coelho's parents committed him to a mental institution from which he escaped three times before being released at the age of 20. Coelho later remarked that "It wasn't that they wanted to hurt me, but they didn't know what to do... They did not do that to destroy me, they did that to save me."
At his parents' wishes, Coelho enrolled in law school and abandoned his dream of becoming a writer. One year later, he dropped out and lived life as a hippie, traveling through South America, North Africa, Mexico, and Europe and started using drugs in the 1960s.

Upon his return to Brazil, Coelho worked as a songwriter, composing lyrics for Elis Regina, Rita Lee, and Brazilian icon Raul Seixas. Composing with Raul led to Coelho being associated with magic and occultism, due to the content of some songs. He is often accused that these songs were rip-offs of foreign songs not well known in Brazil at the time.  In 1974, by his account, he was arrested for "subversive" activities and tortured by the ruling military government, who had taken power ten years earlier and viewed his lyrics as left-wing and dangerous. Coelho also worked as an actor, journalist and theatre director before pursuing his writing career.

Coelho married artist Christina Oiticica in 1980. Together they had previously spent half the year in Rio de Janeiro and the other half in a country house in the Pyrenees Mountains of France, but now the couple reside permanently in Geneva, Switzerland.

In 1986 Coelho walked the 500-plus mile Road of Santiago de Compostela in northwestern Spain. On the path, he had a spiritual awakening, which he described autobiographically in The Pilgrimage. In an interview, Coelho stated "[In 1986], I was very happy in the things I was doing. I was doing something that gave me food and water – to use the metaphor in The Alchemist, I was working, I had a person whom I loved, I had money, but I was not fulfilling my dream. My dream was, and still is, to be a writer." Coelho would leave his lucrative career as a songwriter and pursue writing full-time.

The Pilgrim – Story of Paulo Coelho is the international title for the biographical film Não Pare na Pista, a  co-production between Brazil’s Drama Films and the Spanish Babel Films, in which the younger and older Coelho are played by two different actors. One of the producers, Iôna de Macêdo, told Screen International: "The film tells the story of a man who has a dream. It's a little like Alice in Wonderland – he's someone who is too big for his house." The film, shot in Portuguese, had its premiere in Brazilian theaters in 2014 and was internationally distributed in 2015.

Career
In 1982, Coelho published his first book, Hell Archives, which failed to make a substantial impact. In 1986 he contributed to the Practical Manual of Vampirism, although he later tried to take it off the shelves since he considered it "of bad quality." After making the pilgrimage to Santiago de Compostela in 1986, Coelho wrote The Pilgrimage, published in 1987.

While trying to overcome his procrastination about launching his writing career, Coelho decided, "If I see a white feather today, that is a sign that God is giving me that I have to write a new book." Seeing one in the window of a shop, he began writing that day. The following year, Coelho wrote The Alchemist and published it through a small Brazilian publishing house that made an initial print run of 900 copies and decided not to reprint it. He subsequently found a bigger publishing house, and with the publication of his next book Brida, The Alchemist took off. HarperCollins  decided to publish the book in 1994. Later it became an international bestseller. In a 2009 interview with the Syrian Forward Magazine, Coelho stated that the Sufi tradition had been an influence on him, particularly when writing The Alchemist and later The Zahir.

Since the publication of The Alchemist, Coelho has generally written at least one novel every two years. Four of them – The Pilgrimage, Hippie, The Valkyries and Aleph – are autobiographical, while the majority of the rest are broadly fictional. Other books, like Maktub, The Manual of the Warrior of Light and Like the Flowing River, are collections of essays, newspaper columns, or selected teachings. His work has been published in more than 170 countries and translated into eighty-three languages. Together, his books have sold 320 million copies.
On 22 December 2016, Coelho was listed by UK-based company Richtopia at number 2 in the list of 200 most influential contemporary authors.

However, reactions to his writing have not been without controversy. Though he was raised in a Catholic family, and describes himself as of that faith even now, his stance has been described as incompatible with the Catholic faith, because of its New Age, pantheist and relativist contents. And whatever his sales, reviews of Coelho's later work consistently note its superficiality.

In 2016, he was contacted by basketball player Kobe Bryant, who wanted to discuss a children's book project with him. Some months before Bryant's death in a helicopter crash in January 2020, they started to write the book together, but upon hearing about his passing, Coelho decided to delete the whole draft, saying in an interview that "it didn't make any sense to publish without him." He did not say how many pages had been written or whether the book had a title.

In 2018, it was announced that Coelho had signed for a TV series based on the characters of his novels The Devil and Miss Prym, Brida and The Witch of Portobello.

Bibliography

References

External links 

 
 

 
1947 births
Living people
Brazilian bloggers
Brazilian lyricists
Brazilian science fiction writers
Brazilian male novelists
Chevaliers of the Légion d'honneur
Members of the Brazilian Academy of Letters
United Nations Messengers of Peace
Portuguese-language writers
Esoteric Christianity
Brazilian Roman Catholics
Roman Catholic writers
Musicians from Rio de Janeiro (city)
Writers from Rio de Janeiro (city)
20th-century Brazilian male writers
21st-century Brazilian male writers
20th-century Brazilian novelists
21st-century Brazilian novelists
20th-century Brazilian artists
20th-century Brazilian male artists
21st-century Brazilian artists
Male bloggers